Ted Sherdeman (21 June 1909 – 22 August 1987) was an American radio producer, television writer and screenwriter. He was known for the films The Eddie Cantor Story (1953), Away All Boats (1956), St. Louis Blues (1958), A Dog of Flanders (1960) and Misty (1961); and the TV series Wagon Train (1958-1965), Hazel (1963-1966), My Favorite Martian (1964), Flying Nun (1968), Bewitched (1965). He died on 22 August 1987 in Santa Ana, California at aged 77.

With director James Clark, with whom worked together on Dog of Flanders for Associated Producers Inc, later formed their own company, Gemtaur Productions. They also worked together in The Big Show, which was made with API.

Songs by Sinatra (1945–47) was a 30-minute program aired on CBS on 12 September 1945, at 9 p.m, featuring Frank Sinatra. In December 1946 the director of the programm Mann Holiner was succeeded by Sherdeman.

Filmography

Screenwriter

Producer
 Riding Shotgun (1954)

References

External links
 
 
 

1909 births
1987 deaths
American male screenwriters
American television writers
American radio producers
20th-century American male writers
20th-century American screenwriters